Charles Prentice Howland (September 15, 1869 – November 12, 1932) was an American football coach and lawyer.  He was the first head football coach at Brown University. He coached the Brown Bears football program for the 1892 season and compiled a record of 4–4–2. Howland graduated from Yale University in 1891, and received a law degree from Harvard Law School in 1894. He later practiced law in New York City and worked as a research associate at his alma mater, Yale.

Howland was later a faculty member and research associate at Yale. He was killed in an automobile accident on November 12, 1932, in New Haven, Connecticut.

Head coaching record

See also
 Howland Memorial Prize

References

External links
 

1869 births
1932 deaths
Brown Bears football coaches
Harvard Law School alumni
Yale University alumni
Yale University faculty
Lawyers from New York City
Sportspeople from New York City
Road incident deaths in Connecticut